The following is the 1954–55 network television schedule for the four major English language commercial broadcast networks in the United States. The schedule covers primetime hours from September 1954 through March 1955. The schedule is followed by a list per network of returning series, new series, and series cancelled after the 1953–54 season.

Fall 1954 marked a big change for television when ABC announced a network deal with a significant Hollywood producer. ABC had contracted with Walt Disney to produce a new series called Disneyland (as part of the deal, the network provided funding towards the construction of Walt's amusement park of the same name, opening in July 1955). The series was an instant hit, and marked the beginning of the networks allowing Hollywood programs into their schedules. Thus, Disney became the third significant Hollywood film producer to venture into television production, after Jerry Fairbanks and Hal Roach.

ABC president Leonard Goldenson decided in early 1954 that a television network was not the place for religious programs; as a result, Billy Graham's religious series, Hour of Decision, did not appear on ABC's fall 1954 schedule. Goldenson told Graham that the series was canceled because the poor ratings the series received were hurting the "flow" of ABC's entertainment programs. However, later critics, such as R.D. Heldenfels (1994), reject the stated reason for the cancellation. According to Heldenfels, since Hour of Decision was the last program that ABC aired on Sunday nights (at 10:30), "flow would not have been an issue"; ABC did not air anything in place of the canceled series and gave the slot back to its local affiliates. Heldenfels believes Goldenson "simply felt uncomfortable about organized religion". Another 1953–54 ABC religious series, This Is the Life, also failed to make the 1954–55 ABC schedule.

DuMont's 1954–55 schedule would be the last year the failing television network planned a seven night program schedule, and even this schedule was full of holes. Heldenfels states that the 1954 DuMont schedule "was a checkerboard of programs and empty spaces for [local] stations to fill". DuMont did not bother to schedule anything against ABC's Disneyland, NBC's new series Caesar's Hour, or either of CBS's Arthur Godfrey programs, conceding those slots (and others) to the bigger networks. However, DuMont continued to air Bishop Fulton Sheen's program Life Is Worth Living against NBC's popular The Buick-Berle Show. DuMont's counter-programming strategy, scheduling a religious program against Milton Berle's bawdy show, had met with success in previous years. The rivalry between the programs had caused Berle to joke, "He uses old material, too." Sheen, for his part, once introduced himself as "Uncle Fultie". Still, DuMont's limited success in counter-programming a few slots would not be enough to save the network; Heldenfels states that the DuMont network's programs "resemble the grasping of program straws as much or more as they look like a strategic plan." DuMont would cancel Life Is Worth Living in April 1955, along with most of its remaining programs.

New fall series are highlighted in bold.

Each of the 30 highest-rated shows is listed with its rank and rating as determined by Nielsen Media Research.

 Yellow indicates the programs in the top 10 for the season.
 Cyan indicates the programs in the top 20 for the season.
 Magenta indicates the programs in the top 30 for the season.

Sunday 

 On NBC, The Roy Rogers Show (30/26.9) aired 6:30–7:00 pm, and the Sunday edition of Max Liebman Presents made its debut as a monthly series, airing 7:30–9:00 pm On CBS, beginning this season, The Jack Benny Program alternated with Private Secretary as a bi-weekly series.
Appointment with Adventure, an anthology series, appeared for the first of fifty-three episodes on the CBS 1954–1955 Sunday schedule at 10:00 pm EST, beginning April 3, 1955.

Monday 

Note: On NBC, Producers' Showcase made its debut as a monthly series, airing 8:00–9:30 pm

Tuesday 

Note: Beginning this season, Chrysler's Plymouth division alternated with R.J. Reynolds as sponsor of Camel News Caravan on Tuesdays and Thursdays. The Bob Hope Show and The Martha Raye Show each appeared monthly.

Wednesday

Thursday 

* formerly Meet Mr. McNutley

Note:  On CBS, Willy moved from Saturday to Thursday in April.

Friday 

* formerly Where's Raymond?

Saturday 

Note: On NBC, the Saturday edition of Max Liebman Presents debuted as a monthly series, airing 9:00–10:30 pm. On ABC, Ozark Jubilee premiered in January from 9:00–10:00 p.m. On CBS, Willy moved from Saturday to Thursday in April.

The Soldiers, a live military sitcom starring Hal March, Tom D'Andrea, and John Dehner, produced and directed by Bud Yorkin, aired eleven episodes on NBC Saturday schedule between June 25 and September 3, 1955.

Notes

By network

ABC

Returning Series
The Adventures of Ozzie and Harriet
Bachelor Father
The Big Picture
Boxing from Eastern Parkway
Break the Bank
Cavalcade of America
Compass
Dollar a Second
The Dotty Mack Show
Enterprise
Fight Talk
Jamie
John Daly and the News
Kraft Television Theater
Kukla, Fran and Ollie
The Lone Ranger
Make Room for Daddy
The Martha Wright Show
Masquerade Party
The Name's the Same
The Pepsi-Cola Playhouse
The Ray Bolger Show
The Saturday Night Fights
So You Want to Lead a Band
Soldier Parade
Stop the Music
The Stork Club
The Stu Erwin Show
Treasury Men in Action
Twenty Questions
The United States Steel Hour
The Voice of Firestone
The Walter Winchell Show
You Asked For It

New Series
The Adventures of Rin Tin Tin
 College Press Conference
Come Closer
Disneyland
The Elgin TV Hour
Flight No. 7
The Jane Pickens Show
Let's See *
The Mail Story
Mr. Citizen *
Ozark Jubilee
Paris Precinct *
Pond's Theater *
So You Want to Lead a Band
Star Tonight *
TV Reader's Digest *
The Vise
What's Going On *

Not returning from 1953–54:
Answers for Americans
At Issue
Back That Fact 
Billy Graham's Hour of Decision
Center Stage
The Comeback Story
Dr. I.Q.
The Ern Westmore Hollywood Glamour Show
The Frank Leahy Show
The George Jessel Show
Jukebox Jury
Junior Press Conference
Leave It to the Girls
Madison Square Garden Highlights
The Motorola Television Hour
Music at the Meadowbrook
The Name's the Same
Notre Dame Football
Of Many Things
The Orchid Award
Paul Whiteman's TV Teen Club
The Pride of the Family
Quick as a Flash
Showcase Theater
Sky King
Take It from Me
Talent Patrol
This is the Life
Through the Curtain
Wrestling from Rainbo Arena

CBS

Returning Series
Arthur Godfrey's Talent Scouts
Beat the Clock
The Blue Angel
The Bob Cummings Show
Danger
Douglas Edwards with the News
Four Star Playhouse
The Garry Moore Show
The Gene Autry Show
The George Burns and Gracie Allen Show
I Love Lucy
I've Got a Secret
The Jack Benny Show
The Jackie Gleason Show
The Jane Froman Show
The Jo Stafford Show
Life with Father
Mama
Meet Millie
My Favorite Husband
Name That Tune
Omnibus
Our Miss Brooks
Pabst Blue Ribbon Bouts
The Perry Como Show
Person to Person
Private Secretary
The Public Defender
The Ray Milland Show
The Red Skelton Show
Schlitz Playhouse of Stars
See It Now
Sports Spot
Strike It Rich
That's My Boy
Toast of the Town
Topper
Two for the Money
Westinghouse Studio One
What in the World?
Willy
Your Play Time

New Series
The $64,000 Question *
America's Greatest Bands *
Appointment with Adventure *
The Best of Broadway
Climax!
Damon Runyon Theater *
December Bride
Father Knows Best
Frankie Laine Time *
The Halls of Ivy *
Honestly, Celeste!
Key to the Ages *
Lassie
The Lineup
The Millionaire *
Music 55 *
Professional Father *
Shower of Stars
Stage 7 *
Stage Show
Windows *

Not returning from 1953–54:
The Fred Waring Show
The Gene Autry Show
The Jane Froman Show
The Man Behind the Badge
Medallion Theatre
Meet Mr. McNutley
My Friend Irma
Pentagon U.S.A.
The Perry Como Show
Philip Morris Playhouse
The Public Defender
Quiz Kids
The Revlon Mirror Theater
Suspense
This is Show Business
The Web

DuMont

Returning series
Boxing from St. Nicholas Arena
Captain Video
Chance of a Lifetime
Concert Tonight
Down You Go
The Ilona Massey Show
Life Begins at Eighty
Life is Worth Living
The Music Show
National Football League Professional Football
One Minute Please
Opera Cameos
Rocky King, Inside Detective
The Stranger
They Stand Accused
What's the Story?

New series
DuMont Evening News
Flash Gordon
Have a Heart *
It's Alec Templeton Time *
The Paul Dixon Show *
Studio 57
Time Will Tell

Not returning from 1953–54:
Better Living TV theatre
The Big Issue
Broadway to Hollywood – Headline Clues
Colonel Humphrey Flack
Front Page Detective
Gamble on Love
Guide Right
The Johns Hopkins Science Review
The Igor Cassini Show
Joseph Schildkraut Presents
Love Story
Man Against Crime
Marge and Jeff
Melody Street
Night Editor
Nine Thirty Curtain
On Your Way
Pantomime Quiz
The Plainclothesman
Pro Football Highlights
Pulse of the City
Stars on Parade
The Strawhatters
Washington Exclusive

NBC

Returning Series
Armstrong Circle Theatre
The Big Story
Big Town
The Bob Hope Show
The Buick-Berle Show
Camel News Caravan
Cameo Theatre
Coke Time with Eddie Fisher
The Colgate Comedy Hour
The Dinah Shore Show
Dragnet
Ethel and Albert
Fireside Theatre
Ford Theatre
Gillette Cavalcade of Sports
Goodyear Television Playhouse
The Greatest Moments in Sports
The Hunter
I Married Joan
The Jack Carson Show
Justice
Kraft Television Theatre
The Life of Riley
The Loretta Young Show
Lux Video Theatre (moved from CBS)
The Martha Raye Show
Mister Peepers
My Little Margie
The Philco Television Playhouse
Place the Face
The Red Buttons Show (moved from CBS)
Robert Montgomery Presents
The Roy Rogers Show
Texaco Star Theater
This Is Your Life
The Tony Martin Show
Truth or Consequences
Watch Mr. Wizard
The World of Mr. Sweeney
You Bet Your Life
Your Favorite Story
Your Hit Parade

New Series
The Amazing Dunninger *
And Here's the Show *
The Bob Cummings Show *
Caesar's Hour
Commando Cody: Sky Marshal of the Universe *
The Donald O'Connor Show
The George Gobel Show
The Imogene Coca Show
The Jimmy Durante Show
Make the Connection *
Max Liebman Spectaculars
Medic
The Mickey Rooney Show: Hey, Mulligan
Mister Peepers
Musical Chairs *
Norby *
Producers' Showcase
The Soldiers *

Not returning from 1953–54:
Bank on the Stars
The Best in Mystery
Bonino
Campbell Sounstage
Cheer Television Theatre
The Dave Garroway Show
The Dennis Day Show
Inner Sanctum
It Happened in Sports
Judge for Yourself
The Kate Smith Evening Hour
Letter to Loretta
Man Against Crime
The Marriage
Martin Kane, Private Eye
On the Line with Considine
The Spike Jones Show
Your Favorite Story
Your Show of Shows

Note: The * indicates that the program was introduced in midseason.

References
 McNeil, Alex. (1996). Total Television: The Comprehensive Guide to Programming from 1948 to the Present. Fourth edition. New York: Penguin Books. .
 Brooks, Tim & Marsh, Earle (1984). The Complete Directory to Prime Time Network TV Shows (3rd ed.). New York: Ballantine. .
 Heldenfels, R(ichard) D. (1994). Television's Greatest Year: 1954. New York: Continuum. .

United States primetime network television schedules
United States network television schedule
United States network television schedule